Cauchas rufimitrella is a diurnal lepidopteran from the family Adelidae, the fairy long horn moths. It is found in almost all of Europe, except Portugal, Ukraine and the southern part of the Balkan Peninsula.

The wingspan of the moth ranges from 10 to 12 millimeters. The thick erect hairs on the head vertex are black, more or less ferruginous-mixed above. Antennae in male 2, in female 1.5, black, tip whitish. Forewings shining brassy bronze, sometimes partly or wholly coppery or metallic red purple. Hindwings dark purplish fuscous. The flight time is May to June.

Caterpillars live on the seeds of Cardamine pratensis and then they pupate over the winter.

Gallery

References

External links
 
 

Adelidae
Moths described in 1763
Moths of Europe
Moths of Asia
Taxa named by Giovanni Antonio Scopoli